Raden Mohammad Marty Muliana Natalegawa, more commonly known as Marty Natalegawa (born 22 March 1963 in Bandung, West Java), is an Indonesian diplomat and was the Minister for Foreign Affairs in the Second United Indonesia Cabinet. He served as Indonesia's Permanent Representative to the United Nations from 5 September 2007 until his latest appointment and has also served as the Indonesian Ambassador to the United Kingdom and as a spokesman for the Ministry of Foreign Affairs of the Republic of Indonesia.

Early life and education
Natalegawa was born in Bandung, West Java. He is the youngest son of Sonson Natalegawa, who was a former director of a state-owned bank. Natalegawa is of Sundanese descent.

Natalegawa went to school at Ellesmere College and Concord College in the United Kingdom, from 1976 to 1981. He earned a BSc at the London School of Economics in 1984. He then went on to study at Corpus Christi College, Cambridge where he was awarded a Master of Philosophy in 1985. Natalegawa also obtained a Doctor of Philosophy at the Australian National University in 1993. He was conferred an Honorary Doctorate in International Relations from the University of Cambodia in 2010.

Career
He started his career in the then-Department of Foreign Affairs of Indonesia in 1986 as a staff at the Research and Development Centre. His first service in the Permanent Mission of Indonesia the United Nations in New York was between 1994 and 1999, including during Indonesia's membership of the Security Council in 1996–1997.

Upon his return to Jakarta, between 2002 and 2005, he consecutively served as the Chief of Staff of the Office of the Minister for Foreign Affairs and as the Director General for ASEAN Cooperation in the Department of Foreign Affairs. While serving in the aforementioned posts, he concurrently served the position of Spokesperson of the Department of Foreign Affairs.

On 11 November 2005, he was sworn in by President Susilo Bambang Yudhoyono as the Indonesian Ambassador to the United Kingdom. In this capacity, he sought to elevate and rejuvenate Indonesia – United Kingdom bilateral relations to a higher level as, inter alia, evidenced in the visit of Prime Minister Tony Blair to Indonesia in March 2006 and the establishment of Indonesia – United Kingdom Partnership Forum.

On 5 September 2007, he was transferred to New York as Permanent Representative of Indonesia to the United Nations, a position that he held until 2009. His functions included that of President of the Security Council, Chairman of the Special Committee on Decolonization, and Chairman of the UN Security Council Sanctions Committee on the Democratic Republic of the Congo.

Indonesian President Susilo Bambang Yudhoyono appointed him Minister for Foreign Affairs on 21 October 2009, a position that he held until 2014.

In 2012, he was part of the State visit of President Susilo Bambang Yudhoyono to the United Kingdom. He was appointed an Honorary Knight Commander of the Order of St Michael and St George.

Family life
Natalegawa is married to the Thai-born Sranya Bamrungphong. The couple have three children, Anantha, Annisa, and Andreyka.

References

External links

1963 births
Living people
Indonesian Muslims
People from Bandung
Sundanese people
Indonesian diplomats
People educated at Ellesmere College
Alumni of the London School of Economics
Alumni of Corpus Christi College, Cambridge
Ambassadors of Indonesia to the United Kingdom
Permanent Representatives of Indonesia to the United Nations
Foreign ministers of Indonesia
People educated at Concord College, Acton Burnell
Honorary Knights Commander of the Order of St Michael and St George